Bülent Şakrak (born 26 August 1977) is a Turkish actor and TV presenter.

Life and career 
Şakrak was born on 26 August 1977 in Istanbul. He began his career on stage in 1996 by taking part in youth and children's plays at Kartal Art Studios. In 1998, he enrolled in the Theatre Department of Istanbul University State Conservatory. After leaving Kartal Art Studios, he got roles in Müjdat Gezen Theatre and Yayla Art Center Theatre before entering the cast of Kent Oyuncuları in 2004. There he was cast in various plays such as Dying For It, The 39 Steps, Dealer's Choice and The Lieutenant of Inishmore. After bringing The 39 Steps to stage at the Istanbul State Theatre in 2016, he worked as a narrator for the play Fully Committed, which was performed in the same venue. Aside from his career on stage, Şakrak has been cast in various TV series and has his first role in a web series with BluTV's Dudullu Postası in 2018. He has also presented his own program Bülent Şakrak'la Art Niyet on YouTube.

Theatre 
 Fully Committed : Becky Mode - Istanbul State Theatre - 2018 (narrator)
 Testosterone : Andrzej Saramonowicz - Oyun Studio - 2013
 Macbeth : William Shakespeare - Pangar - 2012
 Dying For It: Moira Buffini - Kent Oyuncuları - 2011
 The Walworth Farce : Enda Walsh - Tiyatro Gerçek - 2010
 The Miser : Molière - Kent Oyuncuları - 2008
 The 39 Steps : John Buchan/Patrick Barlow - Kent Oyuncuları - 2007/2016
 Dealer's Choice : Patrick Marber - Kent Oyuncuları - 2004
 The Lieutenant of Inishmore : Martin McDonagh - Kent Oyuncuları - 2003
 Boing Boing: Marc Camoletti - Sadri Alışık Theatre - 2003
 Buzlar Çözülmeden: Cevet Fehmi Başkut - Yayla Art Center - 2000
 Yedi Kocalı Hürmüz: Sadık Şendil - Müjdat Gezen Theatre - 1999
 Hababam Sınıfı: Rıfat Ilgaz - Müjdat Gezen Theatre - 1998

Filmography

Film 
 Tamirhane (2022)
 Acı Kiraz (2020)
 5 Dakkada Değişir Bütün İşler (2016)
 Son Mektup (2015)
 Yapışık Kardeşler (2015)
 Çilek (2014)
 İksir:Dedemin Sırrı (2014)
 Ay Büyürken Uyuyamam (2011)
 72. Koğuş (2010)
 Abimm (2009)
 Melekler ve Kumarbazlar (2009)
 Eyyvah Eyvah (2009) 
 Kutsal Damacana 2: İtmen (2009)
 Ezber (short film) (2009)
 Süper Ajan K9 (2008) 
 Muro: Nalet Olsun İçimdeki İnsan Sevgisine (2008) 
 Ona Melek Deme (short film) (2006)
 Sır Çocukları (2002)
 Halk Çocuğu (2000)

TV series 
 The Life and Movies of Erşan Kuneri - 2022 
 Misafir - 2021
 Sefirin Kızı - 2020
 Dudullu Postası - 2018 (Web series)
 Hangimiz Sevmedik - 2016
 Ayrılsak da Beraberiz - 2015
 Neyin Eksik? (2013) 
 Karanlıklar Çiçeği - 2012
 İki Yaka Bir İsmail 2012
 Arka Sokaklar - 2011
 İzmir Çetesi - 2011
 Yıldız Masalı - 2011
 Küçük Kadınlar - 2009
 Kurtlar Vadisi Pusu - 2009
 Eşref Saati - 2008
 Gece Gündüz - 2008-2009
 Zeliha'nın Gözleri - 2007
 Güzel Günler - 2007
 Karınca Yuvası - 2006
 Sensiz Olmuyor - 2005
 Kısmet (2005)
 Beni Bekledinse - 2004
 Sihirli Annem - 2003
 Kumsaldaki İzler - 2002
 İki Arada - 2002
 Kınalı Kar - 2002
 Pembe Patikler - 2002
 Yılan Hikayesi - 1999
 Bizim Aile - 1995

Awards 
 2011 - 16th Sadri Alışık Cinema and Theatre Awards, Most Successful Actor of the Year (shared with Hakan Gerçek and İlker Ayrık)
 2008 - VIII. Lions Theatre Awards, Best Comedy Actor (The 39 Steps)

References

External links 
 
 

1977 births
Turkish male stage actors
Turkish male film actors
Turkish male television actors
Living people
Male actors from Istanbul
20th-century Turkish male actors
21st-century Turkish male actors